This list includes terms used in video games and the video game industry, as well as slang used by players.

0–9

A

B

C

D

E

F

G

H

I

J

K

L

M

N

O

P

Q

R

S

T

U

V

W

X

Y

Z

See also 

 List of video game genres
 MUD terminology

References 

video game
Video game terminology
Video game lists
Wikipedia glossaries using description lists